Janáček Theatre is an opera house in the city of Brno, Czech Republic. It is the largest of the three theatres serving the National Theatre Brno ("NdB") opera and ballet company, the others being the Mahen and the Reduta. It was built starting in 1960 after decades of delay and finally opened in October 1965, since when it has premiered some twenty operas and ballets. A major renovation was completed in 2018. The building's façade is north-facing, away from the city center and towards the nearby house of its namesake composer, who is grandly memorialized on the adjacent landscaped green.

History 
The building of Janáček Theatre, the youngest of the buildings of National Theatre in Brno, was planned from the early 20th century. From 1910 to 1957, seven architectural competitions were held to find the best design and project of the building. Around 150 architects participated in the competitions, among them several notable exponents of Czech arts and architecture: Bohuslav Fuchs, Josef Gočár, Vlastislav Hofman, Josef Chochol, Pavel Janák, Jan Kotěra and others. The proposed designs span a wide range of architectural styles documenting the history and development of the Czech architecture in the first half of the 20th century. The styles include historicism, Art Nouveau, Cubism, modernism, Functionalism, Socialist realism and classicising Neofunctionalism.

References 

Theatres in Brno
Opera houses in the Czech Republic
Theatres completed in 1965
Music venues completed in 1965